Apollo Island is a small ice-covered island about  east-northeast of Blåskimen Island in the northwest part of the Fimbul Ice Shelf, Queen Maud Land. The name Apollo appears to be first used on a South African map of 1969.

See also 
 List of antarctic and sub-antarctic islands

References 

Islands of Queen Maud Land
Princess Martha Coast